Due to the ancient land relations and taxation and regulation under the British Raj, at the time of independence, India inherited a semi-feudal agrarian system, with ownership of land concentrated in the hands of a few individual landlords. Since independence, there has been voluntary and state initiated/mediated land reforms in several states. The most notable and successful example of land reforms are in the states of West Bengal and Kerala. The Land Reforms Ordinance was a law in the state of Kerala, India by  K. R. Gowri Amma minister in the first EMS government.

The EMS government was the first communist state government popularly elected to power in India, in the southern state of Kerala. Soon after taking its oath of office in 1957, the government introduced the controversial Land Reforms Ordinance, which was later made into an act.  This, along with an Education Bill, raised a massive uproar from the landlord classes.  The popular slogan for the radical socialists was "the land for tillers", which sent shock-waves through the landlord classes in the country.  The ordinance set an absolute ceiling on the amount of land a family could own. The tenants and hut dwellers received a claim in the excess land, on which they had worked for centuries under the feudal system. In addition, the law ensured fixity of tenure and protection from eviction.
These ground-breaking measures caused the premature death of the state government, as the central government, under Jawaharlal Nehru, used article 356 to dismiss it, alleging the breakdown of law and order. The land reforms in Kerala imparted drastic changes to the political, economic and social outlook.
Different types of feudal relations existed in Travancore-Cochin and Malabar at the time of the formation of the state.  The landless farmers and those who were evicted from their land wanted to get their grievances redressed. The clamour for changes gathered strength. The government which came to power in 1957 introduced the Land Reforms Bill in the Legislative Assembly.  The Agrarian Relations Bill introduced in 1958 was passed with minor amendments.  The legislature passed subsequent land reform bills in 1960, 1963, and 1964. But the historical land reform act, Kerala  Land  Reforms  (Amendment)  Act,  1969 by C. Achutha Menon government which put an end to the feudal system and ensured the rights of the tenants on land, came into force on 1 January 1970. However, cash crop plantations had been exempted from its purview. There have been many amendments to the act since, the latest having been in 2012.

Main objectives
 To bestow on tenants ownership of a minimum of ten cents of land
 To end the old feudal relations by legitimizing the right of real peasants to own the land they cultivate
 To introduce land ceiling and distribute excess land among the landless agricultural labourers
 To abolish exploitation and inequalities in the agrarian sector
 To ensure the consistent progress and transformation of society
 To achieve economic development and modernisation
 To end the era of feudalism

Impact
 Leasing of land became unlawful.
 The Jenmis who lived by collecting lease became extinct.
 The lease holders were given ownership of the land.
 A few big farmers who had cultivated on the leased lands also became owners of that land.
 Land owners sold their excess land.
 Hundreds of thousands of people got dwelling places of their own.
 The labour market was enlarged as former serfs entered it.

References

History of Kerala (1947–present)
India, Kerala
Real property law
Kerala, Land Reform
Reform in India